Jalen Cantrell Richard (born October 15, 1993) is an American football running back who is a free agent.

Early life
Richard was born in Baton Rouge, Louisiana on October 15, 1993, to Krissy and James Richard. He has two younger brothers, Jeremy and Justin. He attended Peabody Magnet High School and participated in track and field and football.

College career
Richard played college football at Southern Mississippi from 2012–2015. As a freshman, he had 87 rushing yards and two rushing touchdowns in a loss at Central Florida. Overall, on the season, he finished with 426 rushing yards, four rushing touchdowns, eight receptions, 39 receiving yards, and a receiving touchdown. In the 2013 season, he finished with 326 rushing yards, 168 receiving yards, and a receiving touchdown. In the 2014 season, he finished with 236 rushing yards, 184 receiving yards, and a receiving touchdown. On September 19, 2015, he had 230 rushing yards and four rushing touchdowns in a win at Texas State. On October 24, he had 114 rushing yard and a rushing touchdown to go along with a 95-yard kick return touchdown against Charlotte. On November 21, he had 161 rushing yards and four rushing touchdowns in a home victory over Old Dominion. In his final collegiate season, his role expanded and he finished with 1,098 rushing yards, 14 rushing touchdowns, 30 receptions, 284 receiving yards, and two receiving touchdowns to go along with a kick return touchdown.

Richard graduated from Southern Mississippi with a major in exercise science.

Collegiate statistics

Professional career

Richard signed with the Oakland Raiders as an undrafted free agent in 2016. He decided to wear the #30 jersey in honor of a god-brother who was unable to continue playing football due to illness.

2016 season
On September 11, 2016, Richard made his NFL debut against the New Orleans Saints rushing for 84 yards on three carries and catching two passes for 11 yards. Richard ran for a 75-yard score on his first career carry. Richard became just the fourth player to have a touchdown run of 75 yards or more in his NFL debut (Oran Pape in 1930, Alan Ameche in 1955, and Ottis Anderson in 1979). On October 9, 2016, he caught six passes for a season-high 66 receiving yards against the San Diego Chargers. On October 30, Richard ran for 34 yards on five carries against the Tampa Bay Buccaneers. On November 6, 2016, Richard ran for 62 yards on eight carries against the Denver Broncos. Richard finished his rookie season with 491 rushing yards, one rushing touchdown, 194 receiving yards, and two receiving touchdowns.

2017 season
In Week 2, against the New York Jets, Richard had a 52-yard rushing touchdown in the fourth quarter of the 45–20 victory. Richard finished the 2017 season with 275 rushing yards, one rushing touchdown, 256 receiving yards, and one receiving touchdown.

2018 season
Under new head coach Jon Gruden, Richard saw an expanded role in the receiving game in the 2018 season. He started the season with nine receptions for 55 receiving yards in a loss to the Los Angeles Rams. On December 2, against the Kansas City Chiefs, he had 126 scrimmage yards (31 receiving, 95 rushing) in the loss. He finished with 68 receptions for 607 receiving yards to go along with 259 rushing yards and a rushing touchdown.

2019 season
On March 7, 2019, the Raiders placed a second-round restricted free agent tender on Richard.
In the 2019 season, Richard finished with 39 carries for 145 rushing yards to go along with 36 receptions for 323 receiving yards.

2020 season
On February 5, 2020, Richard signed a two-year contract extension with the Raiders. In Week 2 against the New Orleans Saints on Monday Night Football, Richard lost a fumble early in the fourth quarter, but later rushed for a 20-yard touchdown to help secure a 34–24 Raiders' win. He was placed on the reserve/COVID-19 list by the team on December 30, 2020.

2021 season
On September 2, 2021, Richard was placed on injured reserve. He was activated on October 9.

NFL career statistics

References

External links

Southern Miss Golden Eagles biography

1993 births
Living people
American football return specialists
American football running backs
Oakland Raiders players
Players of American football from Louisiana
Southern Miss Golden Eagles football players
Sportspeople from Alexandria, Louisiana